All We Need is the fourth full-length studio album and fifth studio album, released in 2011 by Christian recording artist Rachael Lampa.

The album was preceded by the single "Remedy", which has peaked at No. 38 on Billboard's Hot Christian Songs chart.

Track listing

Personnel 
 Racheal Lampa – lead vocals, backing vocals 
 Marshall Altman – acoustic piano, programming, arrangements, string arrangements 
 David Garcia – keyboards, programming, guitars, bass, various instruments
 Ben Glover – keyboards, programming 
 Dan Muckala – programming 
 Jason Pennock – keyboards, programming 
 Christopher Stevens – keyboards, programming, guitars 
 Shannon Sanders – keyboards 
 Chris Lacorte – guitars 
 Chuck Butler – guitars, bass 
 Mike Payne – guitars 
 Drew Ramsey – guitars 
 Tony Lucido – bass 
 Calvin Turner – bass 
 Marcus Finnie – drums 
 Jeremy Lutito – drums 
 Dan Needham – drums 
 Max Abrams – saxophones 
 Oscar Ustrom – trombone 
 Keith Everette Smith – trumpet 
 Lici Brown – backing vocals

References

2011 albums
Rachael Lampa albums
Contemporary R&B albums by American artists